Nelotanserin (former developmental code name APD-125) is a drug developed by Arena Pharmaceuticals which acts as an inverse agonist on the serotonin receptor subtype 5-HT2A and was under development for the treatment of insomnia. It was shown to be effective and well tolerated in clinical trials, but development was halted in December 2008 because the substance did not meet the trial's effectiveness endpoints. Research continues on newer analogues which may potentially be more successful. More recently, nelotanserin has been repurposed for the treatment of Lewy body disease. As of 2017, it is in phase II clinical trials for this indication.

References 

5-HT2A antagonists
Fluoroarenes
Bromoarenes
Phenol ethers
Ureas